Oeneis urda is a butterfly of the family Nymphalidae. It was described by Eduard Friedrich Eversmann in 1847. It is found from Russia (northern Altai, southern Siberia, Transbaikal, Amur, Primorye, Yakutia) to northern Mongolia, north-eastern China and Korea. The habitat consists of steppe-clad slopes.

Adults are on wing from June to July.

Subspecies
Oeneis urda urda (northern Altai, southern Siberia, Transbaikal, Amur, Primorye, Yakutia, northern Mongolia, north-eastern China)
Oeneis urda monteviri Bryk, 1946 (North Korea)
Oeneis urda tschiliensis O. Bang-Haas, 1933 (north-eastern China: Jilin)

References

 Oeneis urda at Insecta.pro

Butterflies described in 1847
Oeneis